Dorin Giurgiuca (December 8, 1944, Mihalț, Alba County, Romania - June 4, 2013) was a Romanian international table tennis player and coach.

Table tennis career
Moving at a very young age with his family to Dej, he started playing table tennis when he was 14.

After he was discovered by Farkas Paneth, he joined CSM Cluj, where he stayed during all his active career, and with which he would win eleven national championships and five European Club Cup of Champions.

At the European Youth Championship in Bled, Yugoslavia, in 1962, he won a gold medal. In 1964, after winning the singles competition of the German, Austrian, and English Open tournaments, he was ranked second in Europe by the European Table Tennis Union.

A lefty and a master of the topspin, he became Romanian singles champion in 1967 and 1970.

A graduate of the Sports Academy in Cluj, after he retired from active play he became a coach.

He died of cirrhosis.

Achievements
national champion every year of his career in different competitions (1961-1974)
twice national champion in the singles competition (1967, 1970)
European youth champion (1962)
Balkan Games champion in the singles, doubles and mixed competitions (1965)
bronze medalist in the mixed competition (with Maria Alexandru, 1967 World Table Tennis Championships 
silver medalist at the European Championship, (with Maria Alexandru), France, 1968
Winner of the English Open title.

Awards
Master of Sport, 1962
Honored Master of Sport, 1994

References

1944 births
2013 deaths
Romanian male table tennis players
People from Alba County
Deaths from cirrhosis
World Table Tennis Championships medalists